Another World may refer to:

Film and television
 Another World (1937 film), a French-German film directed by Marc Allégret and Alfred Stöger
 Another World (2021 film), a French film directed by Stéphane Brizé
 Another World (TV series), a 1964–1999 American soap opera
 Another World (Japanese TV series), a 2019 three-episode anime spin-off from the film Hello World
 Another World Entertainment, a Danish home-video distribution company

Literature
 Another World (novel), a 1998 novel by Pat Barker
 Another World, a 1976 memoir by Anthony Eden

Music

Albums 
 Another World (Andy LaVerne album) or the title song, 1977
 Another World (Brian May album) or the title song, 1998
 Another World (Gerry Rafferty album) or the title song, 2000
 Another World (John Patitucci album) or the title song, 1993
 Another World (The Roches album) or the title song, 1985
 Another World (Stan Getz album) or the title song, 1978
 Another World (EP), by Antony and the Johnsons, or the title song, 2008
 Perfecto Presents: Another World, by Paul Oakenfold, 2000
 Another World, by Astral Projection, 1999
 Another World, by W-inds, 2010
 Another World, an EP by Richard Hell, 1976

Songs 
 "Another World" (The Chemical Brothers song), 2010
 "Another World" (Crystal Gayle and Gary Morris song), 1987
 "Another World" (Gackt song), 2001
 "Another World" (Sonique song), 2004
 "Another World", by Gojira from Fortitude, 2021
 "Another World", by Joe Jackson from Night and Day, 1982
 "Another World", by the Kelly Family from Growin' Up, 1997
 "Another World", by Leather Strip from Underneath the Laughter, 1993
 "Another World", by One Direction, the B-side of "Gotta Be You", 2011
 "Another World", by Richard Hell and the Voidoids from Blank Generation, 1977
 "Another World", by Westlife from Where We Are, 2009

Other uses
 Another World (M. C. Escher), a 1947 woodcut print by M. C. Escher
 Another World (video game), a 1991 cinematic platformer

See also
 Another Earth, a 2011 American film directed by Mike Cahill
 Different World (disambiguation)
 Ni no Kuni (lit. The Another World), a Japanese series of role-playing video games
 Otherworld (disambiguation)
 Un altro mondo, a 2010 Italian film by Silvio Muccino
 Un autre monde (disambiguation)